Julia B. Gentleman (née Brooks; born August 24, 1931) is an American politician in the state of Iowa. She served in the Iowa House of Representatives for the 65th district between 1975 and 1979. She then served in the Iowa Senate for the 43rd district from 1983 to 1991 and then for the 33rd district from 1979 to 1983.

Early life 
Gentleman was born on August 24, 1931, in Des Moines, Iowa. Her parents are John and Marguerite Brooks. She graduated from Roosevelt High School in Des Moines in 1949 and received her bachelors of science degree from Northwestern University in 1953. She married Gregor Gentleman the following year and the couple had three daughters and two sons.

Political career 
A Republican, she served in the Iowa House of Representatives from 1975 to 1979 (65th district) and the Iowa Senate from 1979 to 1991 (43rd district from 1983 to 1991 and 33rd district 1979 to 1983). She later changed party to become a Democrat.

References

1931 births
Living people
Politicians from Des Moines, Iowa
Northwestern University alumni
Women state legislators in Iowa
Republican Party members of the Iowa House of Representatives
Republican Party Iowa state senators
21st-century American women